The 2019 China League One was the 16th season of the China League One, the second tier of the Chinese football league pyramid, since its establishment in 2004. The league's title sponsor was the e-commerce website 58.com.

The season began on 9 March and concluded on 2 November.

Policy regarding foreign players and U-23 domestic players was modified in this season. The same as the previous two seasons, at least one domestic player who is under the age of 23 (born on or after 1 January 1996) must be in the starting eleven. However, the total number of foreign players appearing in matches is no longer related to the total number of U-23 domestic players. A club can register three foreign players at most in the same time and use two foreign players at most in a match. On the other hand, at least two U-23 domestic players must be used in a match. In addition, if there are U23 players who have been called up by the national teams at all levels, the number of U-23 domestic players fielded will be reduced accordingly.

In order to expand the number of teams from 16 to 18 in 2020 season, this season will only directly relegate 1 team instead of 2 teams while 2 teams will enter relegation playoffs.

Teams

Team changes

To League One
Teams relegated from 2018 Chinese Super League
 Changchun Yatai
 Guizhou Hengfeng

Teams promoted from 2018 China League Two
 Sichuan Longfor
 Nantong Zhiyun
 Shaanxi Chang'an Athletic

From League One
Teams promoted to 2019 Chinese Super League
 Wuhan Zall
 Shenzhen F.C.

Team relegated to 2019 China League Two
 Zhejiang Yiteng (Failed to register)
 Dalian Transcendence

Team dissolved
 Yanbian Funde
 Dalian Transcendence

Name changes
 Nei Mongol Zhongyou F.C. changed their name to Inner Mongolia Zhongyou F.C. in November 2018.
 Meizhou Meixian Techand F.C. changed their name to Guangdong South China Tiger F.C. in January 2019.
 Beijing Enterprises Group F.C. changed their name to Beijing Sport University F.C. in January 2019.

Clubs

Stadiums and Locations

Clubs Locations

Managerial changes

Foreign players

A total of four foreign players can be registered in a season and the number of foreign players is limited to three per CL1 team in the same time. Maximum of two foreign players can be fielded in one match.

Players name in bold indicates the player is registered during the mid-season transfer window.

 A club could register one non-naturalized player from the Hong Kong Football Association, Macau Football Association or Chinese Taipei Football Association as native player.
Foreign players who left their clubs or were sent to reserve team after the first half of the season.

League table

Results

Positions by round

Results by match played

Relegation play-offs

Statistics

Top scorers

Source:

Hat-tricks

Awards
The awards of 2019 China League One were announced on 20 November 2011.
 Most valuable player:  Tan Long (Changchun Yatai)
 Golden Boot:  Oscar Maritu (Shaanxi Chang'an Athletic)
 Best goalkeeper:  Xu Jiamin (Heilongjiang Lava Spring)
 Young Player of the Year:  Xu Yue (Shanghai Shenxin)
 Best coach:  Wang Bo (Shaanxi Chang'an Athletic)
 Fair play award: Beijing BSU, Zhejiang Greentown, Heilongjiang Lava Spring
 Best referee:  Wan Tao

League attendance

Notes

References

External links

China League One seasons
2
China